David Henry Arrell (5 April 1913 – 22 March 1990) was a former Australian rules footballer who played with Carlton in the Victorian Football League (VFL).

Notes

External links 
 Dave Arrell's profile at Blueseum
 
 

1913 births
1990 deaths
Carlton Football Club players
Australian rules footballers from Melbourne
Brunswick Football Club players
People from Carlton, Victoria